Rudolf "Rudi" Kopp (31 January 1926 – 29 January 2022) was a West German cross-country skier who competed in the 1950s. He was born in Rabenstein. He finished 64th in the 18 km event at the 1952 Winter Olympics in Oslo. He also competed at the 1956 Winter Olympics. Kopp died on 29 January 2022, at the age of 95.

References

External links
18 km Olympic cross country results: 1948-52

1926 births
2022 deaths
Olympic cross-country skiers of Germany
Olympic cross-country skiers of the United Team of Germany
Cross-country skiers at the 1952 Winter Olympics
Cross-country skiers at the 1956 Winter Olympics
German male cross-country skiers
People from Regen (district)
Sportspeople from Lower Bavaria